Ryan Lethlean born 27 March 2002 is an Australian professional footballer who plays as a Striker and left central Defender for Melbourne Victory. He made his professional debut in a FFA Cup playoff match on 24 November 2021 against Perth Glory, scoring in a penalty shootout.

References

External links

Living people
Australian soccer players
Association football midfielders
Melbourne Victory FC players
National Premier Leagues players
2002 births
Soccer players from Melbourne